Entesa per Mallorca (ExM), or Entesa, was  a nationalist and progressist political party in Majorca. It was founded in 2006 by former members of the Socialist Party of Majorca (PSM) who disagreed with the creation of the coalition Bloc for Majorca. In October 2006, ExM held its first congress, with the main objective of participating in the 2007 local elections in Majorca.

In 2009, ExM joined Republican Left (ERC) in the Balearic Islands to participate in the 2009 European election, within the coalition Europe of the Peoples–Greens.

Between 2011 and 2013, it was part of a coalition with the PSM and IniciativaVerds (IV), taking part in the 2011 regional election. In 2013, the party merged into the PSM to form the new coalition PSM–Entesa.

Electoral performance

Parliament of the Balearic Islands

 * Within Socialist Party of Majorca–Initiative Greens–Agreement.

Cortes Generales

Balearic Islands

 * Within Unity for the Isles.
 ** Within PSM–Initiative Greens–Agreement–Equo.

European Parliament

 * Within Europe of the Peoples–Greens.
 ** In coalition with Republican Left.

References

Political parties in the Balearic Islands
Socialist parties in Spain
Political parties established in 2006
2006 establishments in Spain
Political parties disestablished in 2013
2013 disestablishments in Spain
Left-wing nationalist parties